Georgetown Journal may refer to:

Georgetown Journal of International Affairs
Georgetown Journal on Poverty Law and Policy
Georgetown Law Journal